The Armstrong Whitworth A.W.16 (or A.W.XVI) was a British single-engine biplane fighter aircraft designed and built by Armstrong Whitworth Aircraft.  A number were sold to the Chinese Kwangsi Air Force.

Development
The A.W.16 was developed by Armstrong Whitworth to meet the requirements of Specification F9/26. With the first prototype flying in 1930, it was too late for consideration against this specification, and was submitted against specification Specification N21/26 for a naval fighter for the Fleet Air Arm.

It was a single bay biplane with wings of unequal span braced with N-type interwing struts, and bore a close family resemblance to the A.W.XIV Starling Mk I, though with a less Siskin-like, humped fuselage. The undercarriage was fixed, undivided and spatted. The Armstrong Siddeley Panther radial engine, earlier known as the Jaguar Major was enclosed by a Townend ring.

Problems with the Panther engine delayed the aircraft, and the competing Hawker Nimrod was purchased before the AW.16 could be delivered for evaluation. When it was evaluated, it showed inferior performance to the Nimrod, and had poor handling on an exposed carrier deck.

Armstrong Whitworth continued to try to sell the aircraft, and produced a second prototype (G-ACCD) fitted with a more reliable Panther IIA engine for submission against Specification F7/30 for an order from the Royal Air Force. However, by this time the A.W.16 was out of date, and was quickly discarded from consideration, which was eventually won by the Gloster Gladiator. A number of production aircraft were made, however, with 17 ordered by the Kwangsi Air Force in China 

The first prototype A.W.16 was in 1933 experimentally fitted with the 15-cylinder 3-row radial Armstrong Siddeley Hyena, but this engine suffered from cooling problems and was abandoned.

The second prototype was rebuilt into the Armstrong Whitworth Scimitar fighter.

Operational history
The 16 A.W.16 fighters for the Kwangsi air force were produced late in 1931, and were delivered via Hong Kong. While initially serving in the air force of the local Warlords, the A.W.16s were (along with the rest of the Kwangsi Air Force) incorporated in the main Chinese Nationalist Air Force in 1937.

Operators

Kwangsi Air Force

Chinese Nationalist Air Force

Specifications (A.W.16)

References

External links

 Armstrong Whitworth A.W.XVI – British Aircraft Directory

1930s British fighter aircraft
A.W.16
Biplanes
Single-engined tractor aircraft
Aircraft first flown in 1930